Film Fatales is a non-profit which advocates for parity in the entertainment industry and supports a community of women feature film directors who meet regularly to mentor each other, collaborate on projects and share resources.

History
The group was founded in 2013 by Leah Meyerhoff in New York City.

Prior to the 2018 Tribeca Film Festival, Film Fatales announced two events, including a luncheon with WGA East and The Writer's Lab along with several other organizations. It was also revealed that 10 of its members would have their films featured at the festival.

Membership
Since its founding, Film Fatales has expanded to include over one thousand women directors around the world.

References

External links
Film Fatales (official website)
The Film Fatales Collective Trains a Lens on Gender Inequality
How Women Can Improve Their Lot In The Film Industry
Film Fatales Give Back: The Importance of Community Outreach
One for the Girls: Women Directors Group Spreads to London
The Film Fatales Inspire DIY Chapters
The 5-Point Plan To Solve Hollywood's Lady Problem

Women's film organizations
International cultural organizations
Film organizations in the United States
Women in New York City